Robert Ingersoll Ingalls Sr. (1882–1951) was an American businessman and philanthropist.

Early life
He was born in 1882.

Career
He founded Ingalls Iron Works in Titusville, Birmingham, Alabama in 1910. He also established Ingalls Shipbuilding in 1938. They became the largest privately owned steel manufacturer in the Southern United States and the largest shipyard in the Gulf Coast of the United States. In 1937, he started a shipyard in Decatur, Alabama. To accommodate the growing needs of the Second World War, it was moved to Birmingham, Alabama, then to Chickasaw, Alabama, and finally in Pascagoula, Mississippi. By the time of his death, his company was worth US$40 million.

Philanthropy
He established the Ingalls Foundation in 1943. Among other causes, since 1965, it has funded the Ellen Gregg Ingalls Award for Excellence in Classroom Teaching at Vanderbilt University in Nashville, Tennessee.

Death and family
He died in 1951.

His son Robert Ingersoll Ingalls Jr. (1906–1968) inherited 90% of the company. He sold Ingalls Industries to Litton Industries in 1961, which was ultimately purchased by Northrop Grumman in 2001. He was also a yachtsman, who owned the yacht Rhonda III.

His granddaughter, Barbara Ingalls Shook (1939-2008), was a philanthropist at the helm of the Ingalls Foundation.

Legacy
The Robert I. Ingalls Sr. Hall on the campus of Samford University in Homewood, Alabama is named in his honor. It was built in 1957, and it is home to the McWhorter School of Pharmacy.

References

1882 births
1951 deaths
Businesspeople from Birmingham, Alabama
20th-century American businesspeople
20th-century American philanthropists